This is a list of international co-production films with Uruguay.

List

Uruguay